Astra (foaled January 25, 1996, in Kentucky) was an American Thoroughbred racemare who won four Grade I races on turf.

Background
She was bred and raced by Allen Paulson who also owned and raced her dam and her sire. Her dam was Savannah Slew, a daughter of the 1977 U.S. Triple Crown champion Seattle Slew, and her sire was Theatrical, winner of the 1987 Breeders' Cup Turf.

Racing career
Following the death of Allen Paulson on July 19, 2000, Astra raced for the Allen E. Paulson Living Trust. In mid-2001, trainer Simon Bray retired and her race conditioning was then turned over to Laura de Seroux who went on to match the two Grade I and the single Grade II wins that Bray had had with Astra. In winning her second edition of the Beverly Hills Handicap in 2002 for de Seroux, Astra set a new stakes record of 1:58.56 - for a mile and a quarter on turf.

Broodmare
Astra was boarded at Ashford Stud near Versailles, Kentucky. She produced three foals, all of which raced but with only limited success, before her untimely death on June 12, 2007, at Hagyard Equine Medical Institute near Lexington as a result  of complications from colic.

Pedigree

References

1996 racehorse births
2007 racehorse deaths
Thoroughbred family 9-b
Racehorses bred in Kentucky
Racehorses trained in the United States
American Grade 1 Stakes winners